Culture of Scandinavia encompasses the cultures of the Scandinavia region of Europe, as well as cultures of the neighboring Nordic countries.

Culture of Scandinavia may also refer to:

 History of Scandinavia, history of Scandinavia and the Nordic countries
 Scandinavian prehistory, earlier cultures in the region from the end of the last ice age until the start of written history
 Iron Age Scandinavia (c. 500 BCE–800 CE)
 Nordic Bronze Age (c. 1700 BCE–500 BCE)
 Nordic Stone Age (c. 12,000 BCE–1700 BCE)